Hill-topping (more often spelt hilltopping) is a mate-location behaviour seen in many insects including butterflies, dragonflies, bumblebees, wasps, beetles  and flies. 

Males of many butterfly species may be found flying up to and staying on a hilltop - for days on end if necessary. Females, desirous of mating, fly up the hill. Males dash around the top, competing for the best part of the area - usually the very top; as the male with the best territory at the top of the hill would have the best chance of mating with the occasional female, who knows the "top male" must be strong and thus genetically fit. Many authors consider this as a form of lekking behaviour. Many butterfly species including swallowtails, nymphalids, metal-marks and lycaenids are known to hill-top.

In some Acraea butterflies, widespread infection by Wolbachia results in a rarity of males and in these species the females widely engage in hill-topping behaviour. Female butterflies at hill-topping sites are predominantly of unmated individuals.

Studies have shown that even slight elevation differences on flat terrain can trigger hill-topping behaviour. Flowering or tall trees may induce hill-topping behaviour. 

The concentrating effect of hill-topping on butterfly populations makes such locations of special conservation significance.

References

Insect behavior
Butterflies